Cărand is a commune in Arad County, Romania. Cărand commune is situated in the northern part of the Sebiș Basin, at the foot of Codru-Moma Mountains and its surface is 3813 ha. It is composed of two villages, Cărand (situated at 92 km from Arad) and Seliștea (Bélmárkaszék).

Population
According to the last census, the population of the commune counts 1320 inhabitants, out of which 89.5% are Romanians, 0.2% Hungarians, 9.4% Roms, 0.7% Slovaks and 0.2% are of other or undeclared nationalities.

History
The first documentary record of the locality Cărand dates back to 1429, while Seliștea was documentary mentioned in 1552.

Economy
Although the economy of the commune is prevalent agricultural, the secondary and tertiary economic sectors have also
developed recently.

Tourism
The natural reservations called Pădurea Sic having a 17,8 ha surface and the oak forest stretching on 2,1 ha, as well as the
thermal water springs are the main touristic sights of the commune.

References

Communes in Arad County
Localities in Crișana